The Chirruh snowtrout (Schizothorax esocinus) is a species of cyprinid fish found in the Himalyays in Pakistan, India, Afghanistan, Nepal and China.

Biology 
Found mostly in mountain streams, rivers and gravel-bottomed rivers. They feed on bottom detritus and they migrate to spawn in tributary streams where breeding occurs in gravel and sandy beds.

References 

Schizothorax
Fish of Asia
Fish described in 1838